The 1972 World Field Archery Championships were held in Gorizia, Italy.

Medal summary (Men's individual)

Medal summary (Women's individual)

Medal summary (team events)
No team event held at this championships.

References

E
1972 in Italian sport
International archery competitions hosted by Italy
World Field Archery Championships
World Field Archery